Chinese Taipei (Taiwan) participated in the 2002 Asian Games held in Busan, South Korea, from September 29 to October 14, 2002. Athletes from Taiwan won overall 52 medals (including 10 golds), and clinched eighth spot in the medal table.

References

Nations at the 2002 Asian Games
2002
Asian Games